Anoploscelus is a genus of East African tarantulas that was first described by Reginald Innes Pocock in 1897. It was erected for the species Anoploscelus celeripes, based on a single male collected near Lake Tanganyika in modern day Tanzania. It was synonymized with Phoneyusa from 1985 to 1990.  it contains two species, including A. lesserti, first found in Rwanda in 1946.

See also
 List of Theraphosidae species

References

Fauna of East Africa
Theraphosidae genera
Spiders of Africa
Taxa named by R. I. Pocock
Theraphosidae